Fall Stream empties into Piseco Lake by Piseco, New York. Fall Stream flows through Fall Lake.

References

Rivers of New York (state)
Rivers of Hamilton County, New York